Elizaveta Mikhailovna Boyarskaya (born 20 December 1985) is a Russian theater and film actress.

Biography

Early life and education
Elizaveta was born on 20 December 1985 in Leningrad to a family of two famous Russian actors Mikhail Boyarsky and Larisa Luppian. Her father is of Russian and Polish descent and her mother is of Estonian, German, Russian and Polish ancestry. As a teenager, she graduated from a modeling school. In secondary school she struggled with her studies, but during the last few years she caught up due to private coaching. Because of this, Elizaveta acquired the knowledge of two foreign languages - English and German. When she was about to graduate, Elizaveta was interested in studying "Public relations" at the Faculty of Journalism at the Saint Petersburg State University. But after attending preparatory courses she lost interest in the field. After visiting the opening of the student theater "On Mokhovoy" and several productions Theatre Lensoveta, Elizaveta decided to enter the Theatre Institute. As Boyarskaya herself later recalled, her parents did not dissuade from such a choice, but warned "about all the hidden obstacles".

Since 2006 she has worked at the Maly Drama Theatre (Theatre of Europe) in St. Petersburg.

It took Boyarskaya a few months to prepare for entry into the Saint Petersburg State Theatre Arts Academy. Lev Dodin became her supervisor. During her studies she received the Presidential Scholarship; she graduated SPbGATI in 2007.

Career
She made her debut in 2001 in the sequel film National Security Agent 3, and in 2004 acted in the German film Downfall.

Her first major role in film was the role of Tanya in the film The First After God, directed by Vasily Chiginsky  (2005). Another significant role was that of Vera in the film You Will not Leave Me, directed by Alla Surikova, in which Boyarskaya acted together with her father, Mikhail Boyarsky. She received wide popularity with the 2006 film Park of the Soviet Period and Timur Bekmambetov's movie The Irony of Fate 2 (2007).

It was planned that in the film The Return of the Musketeers, or The Treasures of Cardinal Mazarin Boyarskaya would play the role of daughter of d'Artagnan, but later this role was performed by Lyanka Gryu. She refused this role, because at the same time she simultaneously starred in the film The Admiral and in the 12-episode series I Will Return. In addition, she said she did not find the script by Yungvald-Khilkevich particularly impressive.

In the movie The Admiral (2008), Boyarskaya played Anna Timiryova. She subsequently had roles in the films Do not Tell, Five Brides, Happy New Year, Moms!, Status: Free and Anna Karenina: Vronsky's Story, and in the 2013 TV series Sherlock Holmes.

In 2012, she voiced Baba Yaga in the cartoon Three heroes on the distant shores, and in 2016 gave her voice to the wolf Bianca in the cartoon Sheep and Wolves.

Personal life
Elizaveta Boyarskaya married actor Maksim Matveyev in 2010. On 7 April 2012 Boyarskaya gave birth to her son.

She had another son in 2018.

Selected filmography

References

External links

official website
 Elizaveta Boyarskaya bio at Lifeactor.ru 

Living people
1985 births
Russian film actresses
Russian television actresses
Russian voice actresses
Russian stage actresses
Russian people of Polish descent
Russian people of German descent
Russian people of Estonian descent
21st-century Russian actresses
Actresses from Saint Petersburg
Russian State Institute of Performing Arts alumni
Russian activists against the 2022 Russian invasion of Ukraine